Bjorbekk Church is a parish church of the Church of Norway in Arendal Municipality in Agder county, Norway. It is located in the village of Bjorbekk. It is one of the churches for the Øyestad parish which is part of the Arendal prosti (deanery) in the Diocese of Agder og Telemark. The white, wooden church was built in a long church design in 1884 using plans drawn up by the architect Johan Christoff Friedrich Reuter (1829-1909). The church seats about 650 people.

History

In the late 1800s, the centuries-old Øyestad Church had become too small for the parish which was located close to the quickly growing town of Arendal. Construction of the new church was approved in 1882. The design of the building was based on the design of the nearby Stokken Church which was designed by J.C. Reuter. The new church was consecrated on 23 July 1884.

Originally, this church was named Øyestad Church since it was to be the new main church for that parish and the old Øyestad Church was renamed Old Øyestad Church. Those names, however, did not stick and people began to call this new church Bjorbekk Church since it was on the Bjorbekk farm and they continued to refer to the old church as simply Øyestad Church. The names were later officially changed to match the local usages.

Kristoffer Gunstensen carved the frame of the altarpiece, the pulpit, the baptismal font, and a bell tower. The altarpiece from 1934 was painted by Leonard Rickhard.

See also
List of churches in Agder og Telemark

References

Buildings and structures in Arendal
Churches in Agder
Wooden churches in Norway
19th-century Church of Norway church buildings
Churches completed in 1884
1884 establishments in Norway